Zurarah ibn A'yun (about 690-768 AD) was a famous companion of Imam Baqir, Imam Sadiq, and Imam Kazim.
He evolved the theory that the knowledge of God is an obligation on every believer and cannot be attained without an Imam designated by God, and thus complete obedience to the Imam is a religious duty.

He was a Muhaddith and Islamic scholar with great knowledge in religion, and was also one of the companions known as the companions of consensus whose hadith are given extra credence by Shia scholars. Muhaddith Qummi in his book Tuhfah al-Ahbab said that "his excellence and status are too great to mention here".

Zurarah was a disciple of al-Hakam ibn Utayba before joining al-Baqir. As a prominent traditionist and theologian, Zurarah played an important role in developing the Shia thought. Zurarah lived long enough to also become a close disciple of Ja'far al-Sadiq.
Al-Baqir praised him (along with Abu Basir al-Moradi, Muhammad ibn Muslim, and Burayd ibn Mu'awiya al-'Ijli) as worthy of the paradise. 
Also al-Sadiq lauded him (along with the other three mentioned above) for upholding and promoting the Imami Madhhab, Al-Sadiq also said that the prophetic hadiths would have been lost without them.

The origin of his family 
Some say that his real name was 'Abdu Rabbihi, and Zurarah was a nickname. He was also known as Abu al-Hasan (lit. "the father of Hasan"). Some reports say that his father was a Byzantine monk who was captured and sold into slavery in a Muslim territory to someone from the Shaybani clan, which Zurarah remained affixed to.

Contributions
Zurara’s intellectual activities in the field of scholastic theology greatly strengthened the cause of Ja'far al-Sadiq and later that of Musa al-Kazim. Together with other theological and scholastic problems, Zurara and his disciples evolved the theory that the knowledge of God is an obligation on every believer and cannot be attained without an Imam designated by God, and thus complete obedience to the Imam is a religious duty. The Imams by necessity are endowed with special knowledge. Therefore, what other men can attain by discursive reason ( nazar ), an Imam always knows owing to his special knowledge and his superior and unequalled power of reasoning. 
Zurara and his circle promulgated their views on almost every question of what we now call scholastic philosophy, such as the attributes of God, His Essence and His Actions, His Intention or Will, and the human capacity. The impression we get of Zurara from the sources, especially from Kashshi, is that he played a very important role in the development of legitimist Shi'i thought and contributed a great deal to the formation of the Imamiyya creed. He is one of the most frequently quoted authorities in all the major books of the Shi'is.

His students
Among Zurara's pupils, who were all devoted followers of Ja'far, were his own sons Hasan, Husayn, and 'Ubayd Allah; his brother Hurman, the grammarian and one of the foremost companions of Al-Baqir. Hamza, the son of Hurman; Bukayr ibn A'yun and his son Abd Allah; Muhammad ibn al-Hakam; Humayd ibn Rabbah; Muhammad ibn an-Nu'man al-Ahwal, and Hisham ibn Salim al-Jawaliqi.

Authenticity of Zurarah
More than 2,000 hadith are attributed him. He is described in biographical literature as "respected" and trustworthy". It was narrated that: "Were it not for Zurarah, the sayings of my father would vanish soon".

Death
He died between 766 and 777 AD/149-150 AH in Kufa, Iraq.

References

 

  

8th-century Muslim scholars of Islam
Shia hadith scholars
Jurists